The 1993 Women's Lacrosse World Cup was the fourth Women's Lacrosse World Cup and was played at Heriot-Watt University in Edinburgh, Scotland from 7–14 August 1993. The United States defeated England in the final to win the tournament.

Results

Groups

Group A

Table

Group B

Table

Quarter-finals (Aug 11)
United States v Czech Republic 17-2
England v Japan 23-1
Australia v Scotland 12-2
Canada v Wales 7-6

Semi-finals (Aug 12)
United States v Australia 6-5
England v Canada 8-2

Third Place (Aug 14)
Australia v Canada 4-3

Final (Aug 14)
United States v England 3-1

References

2009 Women's
1993 in lacrosse
Lacrosse World Cup